Goya stictella is a species of moth belonging to the family Pyralidae. It is found in Florida, Illinois, Oklahoma, Tennessee, Arkansas and Mississippi and on the Bahamas.

The ground color of the forewings is light brown to grayish red, but predominantly white anterior to the cell.

References

Anerastiini
Moths described in 1918
Moths of North America